Ladislaus Edmund "Laddie" Bakelman (1900 – 1965) was a cricketer who played on Ceylon's first tour in 1932–33.

Laddie Bakelman attended St. Benedict's College, Colombo, where he was one of the leading schoolboy bowlers in Ceylon. A slow-medium left-arm spinner, he was able to make the ball move either way off the pitch. He played for Bloomfield in Colombo club cricket.

He was the leading bowler on Ceylon's tour of India in 1932-33, taking 35 wickets in five first-class matches at an average of 15.28. In the two victories on the tour, Ceylon's first-ever first-class victories, he took 23 wickets for 202: 6 for 34 and 6 for 65 against Patiala, and 6 for 42 and 5 for 61 against Central Provinces and Berar.

He became a prominent umpire and schools coach in Ceylon.

References

External links

1900 births
1965 deaths
Sri Lankan cricketers
All-Ceylon cricketers
Alumni of St. Benedict's College, Colombo
Bloomfield Cricket and Athletic Club cricketers